The BAE Systems GA22 is an unmanned airship demonstrator programme in response to a need for low cost, long endurance UAV platform.  Lindstrand Technologies is a major contributor to the programme.

See also

References

British Aerospace aircraft
Unmanned aerial vehicles of the United Kingdom
Unmanned blimps